Psycho II is a 1983 American psychological slasher film directed by Richard Franklin, written by Tom Holland, and starring Anthony Perkins, Vera Miles, Robert Loggia, and Meg Tilly. It is the first sequel to Alfred Hitchcock's 1960 film Psycho and the second film in the Psycho franchise. Set 22 years after the first film, it follows Norman Bates after he is released from the mental institution and returns to the house and Bates Motel to continue a normal life. However, his troubled past continues to haunt him as someone begins to murder the people around him. The film is unrelated to the 1982 novel Psycho II by Robert Bloch, which he wrote as a sequel to his original 1959 novel Psycho.

In preparing the film, Universal hired Holland to write an entirely different screenplay, while Australian director Franklin, a student of Hitchcock's, was hired to direct. The film marked Franklin's American feature film debut.

Psycho II was released on June 3, 1983, and grossed $34.7 million at the box office on a budget of $5 million. It received mixed-to-positive reviews from film critics. The film was followed by Psycho III (1986).

Plot
Twenty-two years after his killing spree, Norman Bates is deemed mentally sound and released from a mental institution, despite the protests of Marion Crane's sister Lila. Against the advice of Dr. Bill Raymond, Norman moves to his old home behind the Bates Motel and starts working in a nearby diner. A young waitress there, Mary, gets thrown out of her boyfriend's place and Norman offers her to stay at his home. He later discovers that the motel's new manager, Warren Toomey, is dealing drugs and fires him.

Norman's assimilation into society appears to go well until he begins to receive mysterious phone calls and notes from "Mother" everywhere he goes. A drunk Toomey later picks a fight with Norman, who suspects him of leaving the messages. Shortly after, a figure in a black dress kills Toomey.

One night, after hearing voices in the house, Norman enters his mother's bedroom to find it exactly as it was twenty-two years ago. A sound lures him to the attic, where he is locked in. A female figure later appears in front of two nearby teenagers and kills one. The second one, however, escapes. In the attic, Mary finds Norman, who shows her his mother's bedroom, only to find it back to its state of disuse. The sheriff later questions them about the boy's murder. Mary claims they were out walking together at the time. Norman fears he may have killed the boy, since Mary told him the attic was unlocked when she found him.

That evening, Mary meets with Lila, her mother. The two have in fact been making the phone calls and notes, even posing at the window dressed as Norman's mother. Mary altered his mother's bedroom and locked Norman in the attic so she could change it back. All of this was an attempt to drive him insane again and have him recommitted. However, Mary's growing friendship with Norman has convinced her he is no longer capable of killing. She suspects someone else is in the house, pointing out that Norman was locked in the attic at the time of the boy's death.

Dr. Raymond discovers that Mary is Lila's daughter and suspects the two women must be the ones harassing Norman. Norman does not buy it, saying the one behind everything must be his "real mother", despite there being no record of him being adopted. Norman confronts Mary, who says that she has given up her part in Lila's ruse. Lila, however, will not stop.

While Lila is retrieving her "Mother" costume from the cellar, a shadowy figure murders her. Meanwhile, the police find Toomey's body. Mary runs to the house to try to convince Norman to flee. He answers the phone and starts speaking to "Mother". Mary listens in; nobody is on the line with him. While Norman debates with "Mother" about her command to kill Mary, she runs into the cellar and dresses up as Mother in a bid to get Norman to "hang up". Dr. Raymond grabs her from behind, thinking he has caught her in the act of trying to drive Norman insane, and in her fright Mary accidentally plunges a knife into his heart.

Confronted by the sight of "Mother" standing over Dr. Raymond's bloody corpse, Norman's sanity finally snaps and he advances upon Mary, babbling. Backing into the fruit cellar, she stumbles upon Lila's body, buried in a pile of coal. Assuming Norman is responsible, Mary raises her knife to kill him but is shot dead by the incoming police. In light of an overheard argument between Mary and Lila, Mary's attempt to kill Norman, and her dressing as his mother, the police incorrectly determine Mary committed all the murders.

Later, Emma Spool, another waitress from the diner, visits Norman and informs him that she is his real mother. Mrs. Bates was her sister and adopted Norman as an infant while Emma was institutionalized. Emma reveals that she was the real murderer, having killed anybody who tried to harm her son. In response, Norman kills her and carries the body to Mother's room. He begins talking to himself in her voice, as the "Mother" personality once again takes control of his mind.

Cast
 Anthony Perkins as Norman Bates
 Vera Miles as Lila Loomis
 Robert Loggia as Dr. Bill Raymond
 Meg Tilly as Mary Loomis
 Dennis Franz as Warren Toomey
 Hugh Gillin as Sheriff John Hunt
 Robert Alan Browne as Ralph Statler
 Claudia Bryar as Emma Spool
 Ben Hartigan as Judge
 Lee Garlington as Myrna
 Jill Caroll as Kim
 Tim Maier as Josh
 Oz Perkins as Young Norman Bates

Production

Screenplay
In 1982, author Robert Bloch published his novel Psycho II, which satirized Hollywood slasher films. Concerned by this, Universal decided to make their own version that differed from Bloch's work. Australian director Richard Franklin, who was Hitchcock's student and even visited him on the set of Topaz, was hired to direct Psycho II on the basis of his earlier Hitchcock-inspired thrillers Patrick and Roadgames. Universal hired writer Tom Holland to write the screenplay.

Hilton A. Green, assistant director of the original Psycho, was contacted and asked if he wanted to produce the film. Green, fearing that Hitchcock may not have approved of sequels to his films, called Hitchcock's daughter Patricia Hitchcock and asked what she thought of the film. Patricia Hitchcock gave her blessing to the film, saying that her father would have loved it.

Originally, the film was intended as a made-for-cable production. Anthony Perkins originally turned down the offer to reprise the role of Norman Bates, but when he read the script he agreed to do the film. Perkins said: "When I received Tom Holland's script, I liked it very much. It was really Norman's story..." Before landing Perkins, the studio was exploring recasting the part and Christopher Walken was among those considered. Vera Miles also returned as Lila Loomis, but John Gavin was unable to reprise his role as Samuel Loomis after being appointed U.S. Ambassador to Mexico by President Ronald Reagan. Originally Jamie Lee Curtis was sought to portray Lila's daughter Mary before Meg Tilly was cast.

Filming
Principal photography of Psycho II took place at Universal Studios in Universal City, California on Soundstage 24 from June 30–August 13, 1982. The Bates house set was still standing from 1960, but the motel had to be reconstructed. Similarly to the original film, it was mostly shot on the Universal backlot and in a number of sound stages. Several props and set pieces from the original film were found by set designers John W. Corso and Julie Fletcher, including two Tiffany lamps, the stuffed owl and raven, the brass hands seen in Mrs. Bates's bedroom, the bedroom fireplace, the Victorian bed and armoire, and the 40-foot-long threadbare runner for the staircase. The exterior of the house featured in the original film was relocated to a different section of the Universal Studios lot for the production. The town of Fairvale (seen when Lila Loomis is tailed by Dr. Raymond) is actually Courthouse Square, which is probably best known for its appearance in Back to the Future (1985), located on the Universal Studios backlot.

Both Franklin and Holland wanted the film to be a tribute to Alfred Hitchcock and the original film. To accomplish this, they added various in-jokes such as the scene when Mary and Norman first go into Norman's mother's room, before they turn the lights on, Alfred Hitchcock's silhouette is visible on the wall to the far right. Franklin also repeated various shots from the original film such as the shot where Norman walks into the kitchen and sets his jacket down on the chair. The final pages of the shooting script were not distributed to cast and crew until the last day of filming.

The last shot of the film with Norman standing in front of the house was used as a Christmas card for various crew members. When Universal presented concept art for the one sheet film poster, director Franklin was not pleased with it. It was editor Andrew London who came up with the idea of using the Christmas card photo as the film poster and also came up with the tagline: It's 22 years later and Norman Bates is coming home.

Reflecting on the shoot, Franklin recalled Perkins as being "very generous" on-set, and praised Miles as a "powerhouse" and "one of the most forceful" actors he had worked with.

Music
Composer John Williams was considered to do the score for the film, but it was decided to go with composer Jerry Goldsmith. Goldsmith was a long-time friend of original film composer Bernard Herrmann. On some film assignments Goldsmith would discover that the director had used some of Herrmann's music from other films as temporary soundtracks. Goldsmith would often joke when he discovered this ("Not Benny again!"); when he conducted a rerecording of "The Murder" for the opening of Psycho II he suggested that Herrmann "must be rolling over in his grave".

Goldsmith had written a theme for Norman Bates that was rejected but used for the second segment of Twilight Zone: The Movie.

MCA Records released a 30-minute album on LP and cassette; in 2014 Intrada issued the complete score.

Release
When the film opened on June 3, 1983, it earned $8,310,244 in its opening weekend at No. 2 (behind Return of the Jedi) and went on to gross over $34 million.

Critical reception

Contemporaneous
Variety deemed the film "an impressive, 23-years-after followup to Alfred Hitchcock's 1960 suspense classic". Vincent Canby of The New York Times wrote that the film "has all of the characteristics of a conventional sequel to Hitchcock's 1960 classic but, as you watch it, you may feel as if you're seeing a couple of precocious film students play with artifacts found in the Hitchcock mausoleum". Gary Arnold, writing for The Washington Post, was even less laudatory, referring to the film as "a travesty masquerading as a sequel...if Franklin had any respect for the source material, he might feel a little protective and avoid outrages as conceptually, as well as literally, nasty as the treatment of Vera Miles' character. Psycho II transforms her once sympathetic, heroic supporting role into a hateful bit part and then kills her off with a revoltingly obscene flourish. Has movie storytelling broken down this grotesquely in 23 years?" 

Roger Ebert wrote that, while the film sustained the suspenseful atmosphere of the original and is better than the average slasher film, the film was too heavy on the plot and was too willing to cheat about its plot to be successful. A review published in the Detroit Free Press praised the film as "jumpy fun" and "another cult film in the making".

Christopher John reviewed Psycho II in Ares Magazine #15 and commented that "the real importance of Psycho II rests in its originality. Refusing to be just a blood-letting free-for-all, the picture goes to great lengths to create an entirely new story".

Retrospective
Film scholar John Kenneth Muir praised the film's depiction of Bates in "human, realistic terms", deeming it "admirably frank and sincere" and "a great film on its own merits". In Empire, film critic Kim Newman gave the film three out of five stars, calling Psycho II "a smart, darkly-comic thriller with some imaginative twists. The wittiest dark joke is that the entire world wants Norman to be mad, and 'normality' can only be restored if he's got a mummified mother in the window and is ready to kill again".

On review aggregator Rotten Tomatoes, it holds a 61% approval rating and an average rating of 5.60/10 based on 36 reviews. The site's consensus states: "Although it can't hold a cleaver to the classic original, Psycho II succeeds well enough on its own merits to satisfy horror fans".

When asked his thoughts in 2015, writer Tom Holland replied: "We should have called it something other than Psycho, because it had no more than a passing resemblance to the original. What we did to Norman Bates and Lila Loomis was criminal". Smiling, he added: "Outside of that, it was wonderful".

Home media
Psycho II has been released five times on DVD. The initial release came in 1999 when Universal Pictures leased the film out to GoodTimes Home Video in a 1.33:1 open matte transfer. The second release came in 2005 from Universal itself. The third release came in 2007 as part of a triple feature package with Psycho III and Psycho IV: The Beginning. Shout Factory, under their Scream Factory logo, released Psycho II on DVD & Blu-Ray on September 24, 2013 under their "Collector's Edition" line-up.

RiffTrax released a VOD commentary on the film in May 2013. Universal released Psycho II, Psycho III, Psycho IV: The Beginning and the 1987 TV-movie Bates Motel on DVD as part of its "4-Movie Midnight Marathon Pack" in September 2014.

See also

 Psycho (1960 film), directed by Alfred Hitchcock.
 Psycho (1998 film), a remake directed by Gus Van Sant.
 Psycho III, a 1986 sequel to the first and second films.
 Psycho IV: The Beginning, a 1990 television sequel/prequel to the first film.
 Bates Motel (film), a 1987 television film.
 The Psycho Legacy, a 2010 documentary about the series.
 Bates Motel (TV series), a 2013 television series that reboots the story in modern-day.

References

Works cited

External links

 
 
 
 
 Psycho II at Psychomovies.net

1983 films
1983 horror films
1983 soundtrack albums
1980s American films
1980s English-language films
1980s mystery films
1980s psychological thriller films
1980s slasher films
American mystery films
American sequel films
American serial killer films
American slasher films
American psychological horror films
American psychological thriller films
Color sequels of black-and-white films
Films directed by Richard Franklin (director)
Films scored by Jerry Goldsmith
Films set in 1982
Films shot in Los Angeles County, California
Matricide in fiction
Psycho 2
Universal Pictures films